The official language of the Netherlands is Dutch, spoken by almost all people in the Netherlands. Dutch is also spoken and official in Aruba, Bonaire, Belgium, Curaçao, Saba, Sint Eustatius, Sint Maarten and Suriname. It is a West Germanic, Low Franconian language that originated in the Early Middle Ages ( 470) and was standardised in the 16th century.

There are also some recognised provincial languages and regional dialects.

West Frisian is a co-official language in the province of Friesland. West Frisian is spoken by 453,000 speakers.
English is an official language in the special municipalities of Saba and Sint Eustatius (BES Islands), as well as the autonomous states of Curaçao and Sint Maarten. It is widely spoken on Saba and Sint Eustatius. On Saba and St. Eustatius, the majority of the education is in English only, with some bilingual English-Dutch schools. 90-93% of the Dutch people can also speak English as a foreign language. (see also: English language in the Netherlands)
Papiamento is an official language in the special municipality of Bonaire. It is also the native language in the autonomous states of Curaçao and Aruba.
Several dialects of Dutch Low Saxon are spoken in much of the north-east of the country and are recognised as regional languages according to the European Charter for Regional or Minority Languages. Low Saxon is spoken by 1,798,000 speakers.
Another Low Franconian dialect is Limburgish, which is spoken in the south-eastern province of Limburg. Limburgish is spoken by 825,000 speakers. Though there are movements to have Limburgish recognised as an official language (meeting with varying amounts of success, having previously been recognised as a regional language)  Limburgish consists of many differing dialects that share some common aspects, but are quite different.
However, both Low Saxon and Limburgish spread across the Dutch-German border and belong to a common Dutch-German dialect continuum.

The Netherlands also has its separate Dutch Sign Language, called Nederlandse Gebarentaal (NGT). It has 17,500 users, and in 2021 received the status of recognised language. 

Between 90% and 93% of the total population are able to converse in English, 71% in German, 29% in French and 5% in Spanish.

Minority languages, regional languages and dialects in the Benelux

West Frisian 
West Frisian is an official language in the Dutch province of Friesland (Fryslân in West Frisian). The government of the Frisian province is bilingual. Since 1996 West Frisian has been recognised as an official minority language in the Netherlands under the European Charter for Regional or Minority Languages, although it had been recognised by the Dutch government as the second state language (tweede rijkstaal), with official status in Friesland, since the 1950s.

The mutual intelligibility in reading between Dutch and Frisian is limited. A cloze test in 2005 revealed native Dutch speakers understood 31.9% of a West Frisian newspaper, 66.4% of an Afrikaans newspaper and 97.1% of a Dutch newspaper.

 Westlauwers Frisian
Wood Frisian
Clay Frisian 
Noordhoeks
Zuidwesthoeks
Hindeloopers
Westers
Aasters
Schiermonnikoogs

Low Saxon 
 Northern Low Saxon
 Gronings-East Frisian
Kollumerpompsters
Hoogelandsters
Oldambtsters
Westerwolds
Veenkoloniaals
Stadsgronings
Noordenvelds (Noord-Drents)
Westphalian
Westerkwartiers
 Midden-Drents
 Zuid-Drents
 Stellingwerfs
 Guelderish-Overijssels 
Urkish
Sallands
Achterhoeks
Twents
Oost-Twents
 Vriezenveens (this is actually a separate dialect because of West Frisian influences)
 Twents-Graafschaps
 Veluws
Oost-Veluws
West-Veluws

Low Franconian 

Frisian mixed dialects
 Stadsfries
 Midlands
 Amelands
 Bildts
Central Dutch
 West Frisian
 Mainland West Frisian
 Insular West Frisian
 Hollandic 
 Kennemerlandic
 Zaans
 Waterlandic
 Amsterdams
 Strand-Hollands
 Haags
 Rotterdams
 Utrechts-Alblasserwaards
 Westhoeks
 South Guelderish 
 Rivierenlands
 Liemers
 Nijmeegs
Central north Brabantian
 Zeelandic-West Flemish (including French Flemish)                                                                       
 Zeelandic
 Burger-Zeeuws
 Coastal West Flemish
 Continental West Flemish
 East Flemish

 Kleverlands
North Limburgian
 Brabantian
Northwest Brabantian
East Brabantian
Kempen Brabantian
South Brabantian
 Limburgish
West Limburgish
Central Limburgish
Southeast Limburgish
Low Dietsch

Central Franconian 
Ripuarian
Kerkrade dialect
Vaals dialect

Note that Ripuarian is not recognised as a regional language of the Netherlands.

Dialects fully outside the Netherlands 
Luxembourgish is divided into Moselle Luxembourgish, West Luxembourgish, East Luxembourgish, North Luxembourgish and City Luxembourgish.
The Oïl dialects in the Benelux are Walloon (divided into West Walloon, Central Walloon, East Walloon and South Walloon), Lorrain (including Gaumais), Champenois and Picard (including 
Tournaisis).

Planned languages
The central office of the Universal Esperanto Association is in Rotterdam.

References

Footnotes

Notations

 - specifically, see Table 2.